Mark Winger (born November 26, 1962) is a former nuclear power plant technician from Springfield, Illinois.  He was convicted in 2002 of the 1995 murder of his wife Donnah Winger, an operating room technician, and Roger Harrington (born 1967). Winger had married Donnah Winger (née Brown, born 1963) in 1989.

Murder of Donnah Winger 

On August 23, 1995, Donnah Winger was driven from St. Louis International Airport to her home in Springfield by shuttle driver Roger Harrington. The Wingers later complained to Harrington's employer, saying that Harrington gave Donnah a "hard time" during the ride by talking about getting high and having orgies. Six days later, Mark Winger called 911, saying that he had shot Harrington to death after Harrington attacked Donnah with a hammer in their home. The police initially believed that Harrington had broken into the Wingers' home and attacked Donnah in retaliation for their complaint to Harrington's employer.  However, investigators later became suspicious of Winger because he continued to ask about the case even after it had been initially closed. "He kept coming in. I kept feeling like he was trying to find out if we were checking into anything," said a detective. Winger's remarriage to his young daughter's new nanny, hired five months after Donnah died, increased suspicion. Winger eventually had three children with his new wife.

Four years after Donnah's death, her best friend, DeAnn Shultz, came forward and told police that she and Winger had been involved in an affair at the time of Donnah's death. Winger had ended the affair soon after Donnah's death, and Shultz suspected that he had killed Donnah. On reexamination of the evidence, police concluded that the positions of Donnah's and Harrington's bodies were inconsistent with Winger's account of a struggle with Harrington. They also found evidence in Harrington's car that Mark Winger had invited Harrington to the Winger home. The new theory was that Donnah's upsetting ride with Harrington inspired Winger to plan to kill her with the hammer and then to shoot Harrington, using the fabricated story of an attack by Harrington as a cover. He was charged with murder in 2001.

Evidence introduced at trial included recorded conversations between Winger and Harrington arranging a meeting on the day of the murders. Testimony from paramedics that they found Donnah face down contradicted Winger's statement that he had held his wife before they arrived. Shultz also testified that Winger had tried to involve her in his plot and told her it would be better if Donnah died. In May 2002, a jury convicted Winger of the first-degree murders of Donnah and Harrington, and he was sentenced to life in prison without parole.

Solicitation of murder from prison 

In 2006, Winger was indicted for asking a fellow prison inmate to arrange two murders.  One of his intended murder victims was DeAnn Schultz, his girlfriend at the time of the murders, who later testified against him during his trial.  The second intended victim was Jeffrey Gelman, a childhood friend, whom Winger resented for refusing to post his $1million bail. Winger initially wanted Gelman kidnapped for ransom and then wanted both Gelman and Schultz killed. In June 2007, Winger was convicted for solicitation of murder, and a 35-year sentence was added to his existing life-without-parole sentence. Winger's second wife never remarried and raised all of the Winger children on her own.

See also 

 Uxoricide, the killing of one's own wife

References

External links 

 CBS News — Invitation to a Murder
 Tru TV — Murder by the Book: Murder by Deception
 Winger v. Greene, Case No. 10-3169, 03-29-2021, Richard Mills, United States District Judge
 People v. Winger, NO. 4-13-1113 NO. 4-14-0014 NO. 4-14-0488 cons., 11-08-2016, Justice Turner

American people convicted of murder
Living people
People convicted of murder by Illinois
American prisoners sentenced to life imprisonment
20th-century American Jews
1962 births
People from Elyria, Ohio
Prisoners sentenced to life imprisonment by Illinois
20th-century American criminals
21st-century American criminals
American male criminals
Criminals from Illinois
Criminals from Ohio
Crime in Illinois
Male murderers
1995 murders in the United States
People from Springfield, Illinois
Murder in Illinois
Uxoricides
21st-century American Jews
Virginia Military Institute alumni